In computer science, in the field of databases, write–write conflict, also known as overwriting uncommitted data is a computational anomaly associated with interleaved execution of transactions.

Given a schedule S

note that there is no read in this schedule. The writes are called blind writes.

We have a lost update.  Any attempts to make this schedule serial would give off two different results (either T1's version of A and B is shown, or T2's version of A and B is shown), and would not be the same as the above schedule.  This schedule would not be serializable.

Strict 2PL overcomes this inconsistency by locking T1 out from B.  Unfortunately, deadlocks are something Strict 2PL does not overcome all the time.

See also 

 Concurrency control
 Read–write conflict
 Write–read conflict

References

Data management
Transaction processing